is a media franchise, produced and published by video game company Nintendo, created by Japanese game designer Shigeru Miyamoto and starring the titular Italian plumber Mario. It is primarily a video game franchise, but has extended to other forms of media, including television series, comic books, a 1993 feature film, an upcoming 2023 animated film and theme park attractions. The series' first installment was 1983's Mario Bros., although Mario had made his first appearance in 1981's Donkey Kong, and had already been featured in several games of the Donkey Kong and Game & Watch series. The Mario games have been developed by a variety of developers including Nintendo, Hudson Soft, and AlphaDream. Most Mario games have been released exclusively for Nintendo's various video game consoles and handhelds, from the third generation onward.

The flagship Mario subseries is the Super Mario series of platform games started with 1985's Super Mario Bros., which mostly follows Mario's adventures in the fictional world of the Mushroom Kingdom and typically rely on Mario's jumping ability to allow him to progress through levels. The franchise has spawned over 200 games of various genres and several sub-series, including Mario Golf, Mario Kart, Mario Party, Mario Tennis, Mario vs. Donkey Kong, and Paper Mario; several characters introduced in the Mario franchise, such as Donkey Kong, Wario, Yoshi and Luigi sparked successful franchises of their own.

The Mario series is one of gaming's most successful and renowned franchises, with many of its games, in particular within the Super Mario subseries, being considered to be some of the greatest video games ever made. It is the best-selling video game franchise of all time, with more than 826 million copies of games sold, including more than 385 million for the Super Mario games alone.

Characters

Video games

Origin games

Donkey Kong

After the commercial failure of Radar Scope, Nintendo's company president referred to Shigeru Miyamoto to create an arcade game to save the company. Miyamoto came up with the idea of a game in which the playable character has to make his way through an obstacle course consisting of sloped platforms, ladders and rolling barrels. Miyamoto named the game Donkey Kong, and its main protagonist "Jumpman". Donkey Kong is an early example of the platform genre. In addition to presenting the goal of saving Pauline, the game gives the player a score. Points are awarded for finishing screens; leaping over obstacles; destroying objects with a hammer power-up; collecting items such as hats, parasols, and purses (presumably belonging to Pauline); and completing other tasks. The game was surprisingly successful. "Jumpman" was called "Mario" in certain promotional materials for the game's release overseas; his namesake was Mario Segale, the landlord of Nintendo of America's office/warehouse, who barged in on a meeting to demand an overdue rent payment. Eventually Jumpman's name was internationally and permanently changed to Mario. The success of the game spawned several ports, and a sequel, Donkey Kong Jr., which is Mario's only appearance as an antagonist. Donkey Kong 3 did not feature Mario.

Mario Bros.

The first game to feature "Mario" in the title and to feature Luigi. The objective of Mario Bros is to defeat all of the enemies in each phase. Each phase is a series of platforms with four pipes at each corner of the screen, and an object called a "POW" block in the center. The mechanics of Mario Bros. involve only running and jumping. Unlike future Mario titles, players cannot jump on enemies until they are flipped over; this can be accomplished by jumping under the platform they are on or by using the "POW" block. Both sides of every phase feature a mechanism that allows the player to go off-screen to the left and appear on the right, and vice versa. The game has since reappeared in various forms, including as a minigame in Super Mario Bros. 3 and the Super Mario Advance series, and reimagined as Mario Clash.

Game and Watch

Nintendo has released several Mario and Donkey Kong LCD video games for the Game & Watch line. Eleven were released between 1982 and 1994. Nintendo also licensed the release of six LCD games for Nelsonic's Game Watch line between 1989 and 1994. Many remakes of Game & Watch games have changed the protagonist from a generic Mr. Game & Watch character to Mario. A nearby sequel for the 35th anniversary of Mario was made titled "Game and Watch: Super Mario Bros" in 2020.

Platform games

Super Mario series

Mario then became the star of his own side scrolling platform game in 1985, titled Super Mario Bros., which was the pack-in game included with the Nintendo Entertainment System console. It was also later sold in a package with Duck Hunt. In Japan, a game titled Super Mario Bros. 2 was released in 1986, but a different game with the same name was released internationally in 1988, followed by Super Mario Bros. 3 later that same year. The Japanese version would subsequently be released in the United States in 1993 under the title Super Mario Bros.: The Lost Levels as part of the Super Mario All-Stars title for the Super Nintendo Entertainment System, a console that also features iterations of the game known as Super Mario World. While Super Mario Land and two sequels were the Game Boy installments in the series, the Game Boy Advance did not receive any original entries, only remakes. Super Mario 64 debuted as the launch title for the Nintendo 64 console in 1996. Super Mario Sunshine was the series' entry for the GameCube, and Super Mario Galaxy and its sequel continued the franchise for the Wii. Super Mario 3D Land was the series' flagship title for Nintendo 3DS. The Wii U saw the release of Super Mario 3D World. Super Mario Odyssey would be the first original game in the series to be released on the Nintendo Switch, and was released in 2017.

In 2006, a sub-series with retro gameplay called New Super Mario Bros. was inaugurated on the Nintendo DS, featuring the mechanics of the Super Mario Bros. games. It continued on the Wii as New Super Mario Bros. Wii, on the 3DS as New Super Mario Bros. 2 and on the Wii U as New Super Mario Bros. U and New Super Luigi  U (stylized as New Super Luigi Bros U), with a port titled New Super Mario Bros. U Deluxe on the Nintendo Switch in January, 2019. Super Mario Bros.-styled gameplay is further offered by the level creator game Super Mario Maker, released on Wii U in 2015. A sequel, Super Mario Maker 2, was released on Nintendo Switch in June 2019.

In 2016, the team behind New Super Mario Bros. released Super Mario Run, Nintendo's first real smartphone game and one of the few instances a Mario game was developed for non-Nintendo hardware.

Puzzle games

Dr. Mario series

 (stylized as ) is a series of arcade-style action puzzle video game originally developed by Nintendo Research & Development 1, and later developed by Arika and produced by Nintendo Software Planning & Development. The first in the series, Dr. Mario, was launched in 1990 on the Nintendo Entertainment System and Game Boy to critical and commercial success. In the Dr. Mario series, the player character Mario, who assumes the role of a doctor, is tasked with eradicating deadly viruses. The player's objective is to destroy the viruses populating the on-screen playing field by using falling colored capsules that are dropped into the field, similarly to Tetris. The player manipulates the capsules as they fall so that they are aligned with viruses of matching colors, which removes them from playing field. The player progresses through the game by eliminating all the viruses on the screen in each level.

There have been 4 Dr. Mario games released for home consoles and two portable games, for a total of six original titles. As the series has progressed, each new game has introduced new elements in order to keep the gameplay fresh such as new game modes. In 2001, Dr. Mario 64 for the Nintendo 64 introduced new game modes such as a Story mode, Score Attack and Marathon, Wario as a playable character and four-player multiplayer. After a seven-year hiatus, in 2008, Dr. Mario Express for the Nintendo DSi's DSiWare service re-introduced the series to the portable gaming market. Also in 2008, Dr. Mario Online Rx for the Wii's WiiWare service introduced online multiplayer to the series. In 2013, Dr. Luigi for the Wii U's Nintendo eShop introduced Luigi as the playable character as well as an Operation L game mode in which all capsules assume the shape of the letter "L".

Mario's Picross series
This series is a collection of nonogram logic puzzles involving a grid with numbers for every row and column, which refer to the amount of marked squares within the grid. The games features Mario as an archaeologist who chisels away to form images on the grid.
 Mario's Picross
 Picross 2
 Mario's Super Picross

Mario vs. Donkey Kong series

 is a sub-series of the Mario and Donkey Kong series, based on puzzle video games, making the return of Donkey Kong, Pauline, and the former's rivalry with Mario. The sub-series introduces the Mario-like toys known as Mini-Marios, who later replace Mario as the sole playable characters in all future installments starting with March of the Minis onward.

Captain Toad: Treasure Tracker

Captain Toad: Treasure Tracker is a 2014 action puzzle video game developed and published by Nintendo for the Wii U. It is a spin-off of the Super Mario series which builds upon the isometric minigames starring Captain Toad from Super Mario 3D World.

Enhanced ports were released for Nintendo 3DS and Nintendo Switch on July 13, 2018, including additional bonus levels themed around Super Mario Odyssey, but excluding the Super Mario 3D World bonus levels from the Wii U version. The Nintendo Switch port has sold over 1 million copies, making it one of the best-selling games on the system. A free update for the Nintendo Switch version was released on February 13, 2019, adding co-op multiplayer where another player controls a new purple Toad with white spots in the regular chapters alongside Toad/Toadette, and Toadette in the DLC Special Episode.

Role-playing games

The first role-playing game in the Mario franchise was Super Mario RPG: Legend of the Seven Stars. It has since expanded to the Paper Mario and Mario & Luigi series.

Paper Mario series

 is a spin-off series of RPG video games developed by Intelligent Systems and produced by Nintendo Software Planning & Development. The first game in the series, Paper Mario, was launched in 2000 on the Nintendo 64 to critical and commercial success. In the Paper Mario series, the player controls Mario in a mixture of 3D environments and 2D characters who look as if they are made of paper. Mario can jump and use his hammer to overcome physical obstacles placed in the game's overworld. Additionally, the player accumulates partners as they advance into different locations, who each have a specialized skill required for progression in the game. These characters assist Mario in the game's turn-based battles. Damage inflicted to the player reduces the amount of HP. Attacks in the game are similar to those in traditional RPGs, although the player can influence the power of a move when attacking or defending by timing a button-press accurately or performing some other action command as required. Mario and his partners have a finite capacity to perform special moves, with each of these consuming a particular number of flower points (FP) when performed. Such statistics can be increased by earning Star Points (experience points) in combat to level up. Progression through Paper Mario depends upon interaction with the game's non-player characters (NPCs), who will often offer clues or detail the next event in the storyline. As in other RPGs, the player can find or purchase items from NPCs to help in and outside of combat. Badges can be obtained that yield bonuses ranging from added moves to gradual health restoration during combat; each consumes a set number of Badge Points (BP), meaning Mario can only equip a limited number of badges at a time.

There have been five Paper Mario games released for home consoles and one game on 3DS. As the series has progressed, each new game has introduced new elements in order to keep the gameplay fresh such as a new story, new partners, and new gameplay mechanics. In 2004, The Thousand-Year Door for the GameCube introduced the ability of Mario turning into and folding up into a paper airplane and/or a paper boat to interact with the overworld. In 2007, Super Paper Mario deviated into the 2D action RPG genre and introduced the ability to "flip" into a 3D perspective in which the level rotates to reveal a hidden z-axis, placing Mario in a 3D environment. In 2012, Sticker Star for the Nintendo 3DS introduced the use of stickers in both the environment and in turn-based battles. They can be found and peeled off from various areas in the overworld, and can be purchased or received from non-playable characters. In 2015, Mario & Luigi: Paper Jam also released for the 3DS, in which all the Paper Mario world enters the real one. In 2016, Color Splash for the Wii U was announced that introduced the use of colors in both the environment and in turn-based battles, just like in Sticker Star. In 2020, The Origami King was announced on the Switch with the use of origami.

Mario & Luigi series

The Mario & Luigi spin-off series, developed by AlphaDream, was formed exclusively throughout handheld consoles. The series began with the release of Superstar Saga for the Game Boy Advance in 2003. In 2017, Superstar Saga + Bowser's Minions for the Nintendo 3DS introduced a remake of the original game with added graphics, an improved map allowing players to place pinpoints, and an additional mode called Minion Quest: The Search for Bowser, which provides a storyline that allows you to take control of Bowser's Minions to search for their leader, facing many obstacles in their way. In 2005, Partners in Time for the Nintendo DS introduced their younger selves: Baby Mario, Baby Luigi, Toadsworth the younger, Baby Peach and Baby Bowser. In 2009, Bowser's Inside Story also for the DS introduced Mario, Luigi and the others inside of Bowser's body. In 2018, Bowser's Inside Story + Bowser Jr.'s Journey for the 3DS introduced a remake of the original game with added graphics, an improved map allowing players to place pinpoints, and an additional mode called Bowser Jr.'s Journey. In 2013, Dream Team for the 3DS introduced Dreamy Luigi, where Luigi sleeps in the Dream World in celebrating the Year of Luigi. In 2015, Paper Jam also for the 3DS also included Paper Mario as a playable character when Luigi knocks over the book containing him.

Party games

Mario Party series 

In 1998, the Hudson game Mario Party was released for the Nintendo 64. Following this, nine numbered sequels have since been released, making for ten numbered titles, along with three non-numbered main series titles, Mario Party DS (2007), Super Mario Party (2018) and Mario Party Superstars (2021). The series also has four spins offs that differ in gameplay, including Mario Party Advance, Island Tour, Star Rush, and The Top 100. Mario Party is a multiplayer party game featuring Mario series characters in which four human- or computer-controlled characters compete in a board game interspersed with minigames.

Sports games 

There have been numerous sports games in the Mario franchise.

Mario Tennis series 
The first appearances of Mario in tennis games were as a referee in Tennis for the NES and Game Boy. These games did not use the Mario branding and only featured Mario in the capacity of a cameo. He then appeared in Mario's Tennis for the Virtual Boy. After this, Camelot Software Planning released Mario Tennis for the Nintendo 64. They would subsequently develop other games in this series: Mario Power Tennis for the GameCube and Wii, Power Tour for the Game Boy Advance, Mario Tennis Open for the Nintendo 3DS, Ultra Smash for the Wii U, and Aces for the Nintendo Switch.

Mario Golf series 
The first use of Mario's likeness in a golf game was that the golfer in Golf for NES and Game Boy featured a mustached man resembling Mario. Later, NES Open Tournament Golf was released. It featured Mario and Luigi as the golfers, with Princess Toadstool and Princess Daisy as their caddies. Mario Golf was released for the Nintendo 64 in 1999. It was followed by Mario Golf: Toadstool Tour for the GameCube, Mario Golf: Advance Tour for the Game Boy Advance and Mario Golf: World Tour for the Nintendo 3DS.
Nintendo released Mario Golf: Super Rush for the Nintendo Switch in summer of 2021.

Mario Baseball series 
Mario and Luigi were team captains in Baseball for the Game Boy. Mario Superstar Baseball was released for the GameCube and Mario Super Sluggers for the Wii.

Mario Strikers series 
The game of football was introduced in one of the minigames in Mario Party 4 as "GOOOOOOOAL!!". The Mario Strikers series (Mario Football in Europe) made its debut for the GameCube with Super Mario Strikers in 2005, developed by Next Level Games. Mario Strikers Charged was released for the Wii in 2007. Mario Strikers: Battle League was released for the Nintendo Switch in 2022.

Mario and Sonic at the Olympic Games series 
In 2008, Mario and his friends appeared alongside the characters from Sonic the Hedgehog in the sports game, Mario & Sonic at the Olympic Games, developed by Sega as the crossover series. A follow-up, Olympic Winter Games, was released in 2009 and Mario & Sonic at the London 2012 Olympic Games was released between November 2011 (Wii) and February 2012 (Nintendo 3DS). On November 15, 2013, a third sequel called Sochi 2014 Olympic Winter Games was released exclusively on the Wii U, with a fourth sequel, Mario & Sonic at the Rio 2016 Olympic Games for the Wii U, Nintendo 3DS and arcade in 2016. A fifth sequel, Mario & Sonic at the Olympic Games Tokyo 2020, was released on Nintendo Switch in November 2019. In December 2021, the series was cancelled after six games due to the China controversy.

Racing games

Mario Kart series 

 is a series of go-kart-style racing video games primarily developed by Nintendo Entertainment Analysis & Development. The first in the series, Super Mario Kart, was launched in 1992 on the Super Nintendo Entertainment System to critical and commercial success. In the Mario Kart series, players compete in go-kart races, controlling one of a selection of characters from the Mario franchise. One of the features of the series is the use of various power-up items obtained by driving into item boxes laid out on the course. These power-ups include Super Mushrooms to give players a speed boost, Koopa Troopa Shells to be thrown at opponents, and banana peels that can be laid on the track as hazards.

There have been six Mario Kart games released for home consoles, one enhanced port, three portable games, one game for smartphones, and four Namco co-developed arcade spin-off games, for a total of fifteen. As the series has progressed, each new game has introduced new elements in order to keep the gameplay fresh such as new courses, new items, and new playable characters. In 1996 and 1997, Mario Kart 64 for the Nintendo 64 introduced 4-player racing and 3D graphics. In 2001, Super Circuit for the Game Boy Advance introduced the ability to unlock retro tracks from previous installments. In 2003, Double Dash for the Nintendo GameCube introduced co-operative LAN multiplayer and two-player karts with one player driving and the other player on the back of the vehicle throwing out hazards. In 2005, Mario Kart DS for the Nintendo DS introduced dual-screen play and online multiplayer via Wi-Fi. In 2008, Mario Kart Wii introduced motion controls, 12-player racing, motorbikes and playable Mii characters, as well as three new items: the POW Block, Mega Mushroom, and Thunder Cloud. In 2011, Mario Kart 7 for the Nintendo 3DS featured optional stereoscopic graphics, introduced hang gliding and submersible karts, an alternate first-person perspective, and kart customization. In 2014, Mario Kart 8 for the Wii U introduced anti-gravity racing, ATVs, uploading highlights to YouTube via Mario Kart TV, up to four local players in Grand Prix races, downloadable content, and is the first in the series to boast HD graphics. In 2017, Mario Kart 8 Deluxe for the Nintendo Switch was released as an enhanced port of the Wii U version, featuring an improved battle mode and several new characters.

Possibly the most popular spin-off series in the franchise, the Mario Kart series began in 1992 and is currently the most successful and longest-running kart racing series, having sold over 150,000,000 copies worldwide.

Educational games 

In the early 1990s, many educational games were released in the Mario series. One example of a educational Mario game is "Mario teaches Typing". Few of these games were platformers; most sought to teach skills such as typing, mathematics or history. They are officially licensed but not officially recognized by Nintendo. The games were developed independently by Software Toolworks, Interplay and Brainstorm. Nine educational games were released from 1991 to 1996.

Games not published by Nintendo 
This section covers games developed by other companies without significant Nintendo involvement.

Hudson 
Hudson Soft released two games based on Mario Bros. and another similar to Super Mario Bros.

Mario Bros. Special is a video game released in 1984 for the Japanese computers NEC PC-6001mkII, NEC PC-6601, NEC PC-8801, FM-7 and Sharp X1. It is a remake of the original Mario Bros., with new stages, mechanics and gameplay.

Punch Ball Mario Bros. is a video game released in 1984 for the Japanese computers NEC PC-6001mkII, NEC PC-6601, NEC PC-8801, FM-7 and Sharp X1. It is similar to the original Mario Bros., but featured a new gameplay mechanic of "punch balls", small balls which Mario and Luigi can kick into enemies to stun them, instead of hitting them from below, as in the original.

Hudson Soft was originally responsible for the Mario Party series until Mario Party DS in 2007, but as of March 2012 this has been taken over by NDcube since Hudson has become a part of Konami. Many of Hudson's employees now work for NDcube.

Philips 
Three games were planned for development by Philips Interactive Media for use on its CD-i machine: Super Mario's Wacky Worlds, Hotel Mario, and Mario Takes America. Only Hotel Mario was released; Super Mario's Wacky Worlds and Mario Takes America were eventually cancelled. Philips was given permission to use Nintendo characters in CD-i games due to their taking part in developing an unreleased add-on for the Super Nintendo Entertainment System (SNES). Hotel Mario did not gain much success, with Nintendo rarely acknowledging it as part of the Mario series.

Super Mario's Wacky Worlds is a cancelled video game planned for the CD-i, developed by NovaLogic, which attempted to duplicate the gameplay of Super Mario World. Though the game sprites are based on those in Super Mario World, the level design is based on Earth locations rather than Dinosaur Land. Due to the limitations of the CD-i, several features could not be included in the game, such as large numbers of sprites on the screen, and many visual effects. The nature of the pointing device controller provides difficult controls for Mario, as the game has the default controls of running and jumping.

Mario Takes America was proposed about Mario's trip to Hollywood to make his own movie. The game's concept initially impressed Philips, but was cancelled due to the company being unsatisfied with the game's development progress.

Hotel Mario is a puzzle game developed by Fantasy Factory and published by Philips Interactive Media for the CD-i in 1994. The primary characters of the game are Mario and Luigi, who must find Princess Peach by going through seven Koopa Hotels in the Mushroom Kingdom. Every hotel is divided into multiple stages, and the objective is to close all doors on each stage. The game has been criticized as one of the worst Mario-centered games, mainly because of its cutscenes and simple gameplay.

Ubisoft
Mario + Rabbids Kingdom Battle is a turn-based tactical role-playing video game developed by Ubisoft Milan (Ubisoft's Italian studio division) for the Nintendo Switch. The game is a crossover with Ubisoft's Raving Rabbids franchise, and features both singleplayer and cooperative multiplayer gameplay. The game's story sees players controlling Mario, his friends, and a group of Rabbids dressed as them, dealing with the aftermath of a sudden invasion by a group of Rabbids, who have accidentally misused a powerful invention that has brought chaos to the Mushroom Kingdom. Shigeru Miyamoto was initially impressed by the prototype of the game, that was presented to him by creative director Davide Soliani in 2014, which later caused Nintendo to greenlight the game for a Nintendo Switch release. It was released in Europe and North America on August 29, 2017, and was met with generally favorable reception from critics, who praised its gameplay, depth, and graphics.

A sequel, Mario + Rabbids Sparks of Hope, was released on October 28, 2022 for the Nintendo Switch.

Others 
Electronic Arts (creator of games such as FIFA, Battlefield, Apex Legends and many other games) developed and released NBA Street V3 and SSX on Tour in 2005, both of which included Mario, Luigi, and Peach as playable characters in the GameCube versions.

Square Enix released Itadaki Street DS & Wii including many characters from Mario games.

Other media 

The Mario franchise includes many comics, manga and TV series based on the games. Most were released in the late 1980s to early 1990s, and have since become obscure. The series launched two films, the anime Super Mario Bros.: The Great Mission to Rescue Princess Peach! released in 1986 and the live action film Super Mario Bros. in 1993. The latter lost a large amount of money at the box office and was widely considered to be a failure.

Television 

Saturday Supercade was an animated television series produced for Saturday mornings by Ruby-Spears Productions. It ran for two seasons on CBS, beginning in 1983. Each episode comprised several shorter segments featuring video game characters from the Golden Age of Arcade Games. Donkey Kong, Mario and Pauline (from the Donkey Kong arcade game) were featured in the show.

The Super Mario Bros. Super Show! is the first American TV series based on the Mario NES games. It was broadcast in syndication from September 4 to December 1, 1989. Based on Super Mario Bros. and Super Mario Bros. 2. The show was produced by DIC Entertainment and was distributed for syndicated television by Viacom Enterprises (full rights have since reverted to DiC through Nintendo).

King Koopa's Kool Kartoons was a live action children's television show broadcast in Southern California during the holiday season of 1989-90. The show starred King Koopa (also known as Bowser), the main antagonist of the Mario series. The 30-minute program was originally broadcast during the after-school afternoon time-slots on Los Angeles-based KTTV Fox 11.

The Adventures of Super Mario Bros. 3 is the second TV series based on the Mario NES games. It aired on NBC from September 8 to December 1, 1990. Based on the Super Mario Bros. 3 video game, the cartoon shows Mario, Luigi, Princess Toadstool and Toad fighting against Bowser and his Koopalings, who went by different names on the show (Hip, Hop, Kooky, Kootie Pie, Big Mouth, Cheatsy, and Bully). Like the previous Mario cartoon series, the animation was done by Sei Young Animation Co. Ltd, however this show was co-produced by Reteitalia S.P.A., hence the slight differences in character design.

Super Mario Challenge was a show which aired on The Children's Channel. It ran from 1990 to 1991 and aired at 4:30 p.m. every weekday. The presenter, John Lenahan, was a lookalike of Mario, and dressed in his clothes. Two guest players had to do tasks, all of which involved playing the Mario video games Super Mario Bros., Super Mario Bros. 2 and, after its release in 1991, Super Mario Bros. 3. Rounds included challenges to see which player could complete a level in the fastest time and who could collect the most gold coins on a certain level.

Super Mario World is an animated television series based on the SNES video game of the same name. It is the third and currently last Saturday morning cartoon based on the Mario series. The show was originally aired on Saturday mornings on NBC in the 1991–92 season. It was featured in a half-hour time slot with a shortened version of Captain N: The Game Master. Episodes of Super Mario World were later shown as part of the syndication package Captain N & The Video Game Masters. Afterwards, the series was split from Captain N altogether and shown in time-compressed reruns on Mario All-Stars.

Anime 
Super Mario Bros.: The Great Mission to Rescue Princess Peach! is a Japanese anime film released on July 20, 1986. Directed by Masami Hata and produced by Masakatsu Suzuki and Tsunemasa Hatano, it stars Mario and Luigi, who get stuck in a Famicom video game, in which they must save Princess Peach from King Koopa. A manga adaptation of the film was published in Japan around the same time as the film's release.

A series of three OVA episodes titled Amada Anime Series: Super Mario Bros., based on Momotarō, Issun-bōshi and Snow White, were released on August 3, 1989. These generally featured Mario as the hero, Peach as the damsel and Bowser as the villain, with other Mario characters playing supporting roles.

Films

1993 live-action film

Super Mario Bros. is an American 1993 adventure family comedy loosely based on the video game of the same name. The film follows the exploits of Mario (Bob Hoskins) and Luigi (John Leguizamo) in a dystopia ruled by King Koopa (Dennis Hopper). It was the first live-action major motion picture to be based on a video game. The film's plot features Mario and Luigi as the main protagonists, Mario leading the team with Luigi developing a romance with Princess Daisy.

The film grossed $21 million on a $48 million budget. On the television show Siskel & Ebert, the film received two thumbs down and was written off as a box office flop.

Upcoming 2023 animated film

The Super Mario Bros. Movie is currently in development and is scheduled to be released on April 5, 2023 by Universal Pictures in North America. Produced by Illumination and Nintendo, the film will feature the voices of Chris Pratt as Mario, Anya Taylor-Joy as Peach, Charlie Day as Luigi, Jack Black as Bowser, Keegan-Michael Key as Toad, Seth Rogen as Donkey Kong, Kevin Michael Richardson as Kamek, and Fred Armisen as Cranky Kong. Charles Martinet, Mario's in-game voice actor, will also provide cameo roles. Aaron Horvath and Michael Jelenic, the developers of Teen Titans Go!, will direct, while Matthew Fogel will write the screenplay. Shigeru Miyamoto and Chris Meledandri are the producers.

Other film appearances and cameos
Bowser and the Super Mushroom had a cameo in the 2012 Disney computer-animated film Wreck-It Ralph. Mario was mentioned but not seen in the film. Banzai Bills from the Mario franchise also appear in the 2022 film Chip 'n Dale: Rescue Rangers.

Comics and manga 
It is serialized in CoroCoro Comic. It contains many characters and scenarios from Mario games, such as Super Mario World and Paper Mario. Having just hit its 41st volume, Super Mario-kun is the longest-running Mario series manga to date. It continues to release new volumes to date.

The Nintendo Comics System was a series of comic books published by Valiant Comics in 1990 and 1991. It was part of a licensing deal with Nintendo, featuring characters from their video games and the cartoons based on them. Valiant's Super Mario Bros. comic books were based on the three main Mario games on the Nintendo Entertainment System, as well as The Super Mario Bros. Super Show. The Mario line was renewed for 1991 with two different books—Super Mario Bros. and Adventures of the Super Mario Bros.

The Nintendo Adventure Book series was published from 1991 to 1992 by Archway books, and Mammoth books in the United Kingdom. There are twelve in all. They are formatted like the popular Choose Your Own Adventure books, where the reader makes decisions that change the outcome of the story. Ten of the books are about the Mario Bros.' adventures in the Mushroom Kingdom and are based primarily on the Valiant Comics published for the Nintendo Comics System imprint.

 is an anthology of comics, drawn in a Japanese manga style, that ran in Nintendo Power magazine throughout 1992, featuring the characters from Nintendo's Mario series and based loosely on Super Mario World.

Immediately following the end of Super Mario Adventures, Nintendo Power concluded the epic with a ten-page story based on Super Mario Land 2: 6 Golden Coins titled Mario VS Wario, which ran in their January 1993 issue and was later reprinted in the graphic novel.

At one point, Archie Comics made a pitch to Nintendo for a new Mario comic similar to its Sonic the Hedgehog series, but it was turned down.

An encyclopedia based on Super Mario Bros. was released in Japan in October 2015. In February 2017, Nintendo announced that the encyclopedia would launch in North America and Europe in June 2017.

Another encyclopedia based on the series up until Super Mario Maker was published by Dark Horse Publishing on October 23, 2018.

Merchandise 

Mario has appeared on lunch boxes, T-shirts, jeans, magazines, commercials (notably, in a Got Milk? commercial), in candy form, on shampoo bottles, cereal, badges, and as a plush toy. In 1992, Gottlieb created a Super Mario themed pinball machine. A Monopoly board game based on the Mario franchise has been confirmed by the website USAopoly. In April 2017, a board game developed by USAopoly titled Super Mario Level Up! was announced for release. Another Monopoly-inspired board game called Monopoly Gamer was released in August 2017. In addition, Monopoly Gamer adds a Mario Kart version with courses from Mario Kart 8 serving as properties. LINE released four voiced Mario sticker sets. Mario-themed Lego sets were released in August 2020. These sets feature an electronic Mario figure that interacts with other parts of the set.

Concerts and performances 
The Super Mario Bros. theme has been featured in many concerts, including "PLAY! Chicago", the Columbus Symphony Orchestra, the Mario & Zelda Big Band Live, Play! A Video Game Symphony, and others.

The Video Games Live concert featured the theme performed by Koji Kondo.

Reception 

The Mario series has received highly positive reception from critics and audiences. A 1996 article in Next Generation declared that "The evolution of the Mario series led the rest of gaming by the hand, blazing a trail, and teaching lessons in game mechanics, structure, and sheer playability to any who would study its secrets".

Impact and legacy 
Mario has been featured in 256 games of various genres (including sports, puzzle, party, racing and first-person shooter), and the Mario franchise is the best-selling video game franchise of all time. At least 31 different Mario games have sold more than a million copies each since 1995. This includes the core Super Mario series, which alone has sold over 370 million units worldwide, as well as the Mario Kart series which sold 154.26 million units, the Mario Party series which sold over 56 million copies, Donkey Kong which sold over 125,000 arcade machines and six million Coleco cartridges, and Mario Bros. which sold 1.72 million Famicom cartridges. By 2002, the Super Mario series had grossed more than $7 billion in software sales. Merch wise the franchise used to make more than $200 million in annual sales.

See also
 List of Luigi video games

Notes

References

External links

Official website

 
Nintendo franchises
Video game franchises
Video game franchises introduced in 1981
Video games produced by Shigeru Miyamoto
Video games adapted into comics
Video games adapted into films
Video games adapted into television shows
Action-adventure games